Colaspidea grossa is a species of beetle in the Chrysomelidae family, that can be found in North Africa particularly in Morocco and Southern Spain.

References

Eumolpinae
Beetles described in 1866
Beetles of North Africa
Beetles of Europe
Taxa named by Léon Fairmaire